The Light welterweight competition at the 2019 AIBA Women's World Boxing Championships was held between 7 and 13 October 2019.

Schedule
The schedule was as follows:

All times are Irkutsk Time (UTC+8)

Results

Finals

Top half

Section 1

Section 2

Bottom half

Section 3

Section 4

References

External links
Draw

Light welterweight